Jay Noah Rich-Baghuelou (born 22 October 1999) is an Australian professional footballer who plays as a defender for Accrington Stanley.

Club career
He played for Gold Coast City in the National Premier Leagues Queensland before moving to Britain whilst still a teenager. Initially, he played as a striker but was converted into central defence whilst appearing for Dulwich Hamlet. He also turned out for Welling United before earning a trial and subsequent contract at Crystal Palace, after being scouted by Palace’s Shaun Derry. Whilst at Crystal Palace he has captained their under-23 team. On 14 January 2022, Rich-Baghuelou joined League One side Accrington Stanley for an undisclosed fee.

International career
In July 2021 Rich-Baghuelou was called up to the Australia national under-23 soccer team competing at the delayed 2020 Summer Games in Tokyo. Prior to that announcement he had started all three games the Olyroos played as Olympic warm up whilst in Spain in June 2021.

Rich-Baghuelou made his Olympic debut on 28 July 2021 against Egypt. He was part of the Tokyo 2020 Olympics Olyroos squad. The team beat Argentina in their first group match but were unable to win another match. They were therefore not in medal contention.

References

External links

1999 births
Living people
Soccer players from Sydney
Australian soccer players
Association football defenders
Dulwich Hamlet F.C. players
Welling United F.C. players
Crystal Palace F.C. players
Accrington Stanley F.C. players
National League (English football) players
Olympic soccer players of Australia
Footballers at the 2020 Summer Olympics
Australian people of Greek descent
Australian expatriate sportspeople in England